The second largest country in the world, India, is home to approximately 63 million people of the deaf and hard of hearing community (DHH). India's government has focused much on modernizing the country with technological resources and infrastructure that it has completely ignored the needs of the DHH residents of India. Although, sign language has been evolving within the country for the last hundreds, it was not until 2017 when the Indian government decided to codify sign language in a dictionary format.

Cultural neglect 
In a study conducted by Dr. Jill Jepson, a fellow of the National Institute on Aging at the University of California, San Francisco, she examined the linguistics and sociolinguistics of sign language and hearing within India. Dr. Jepson diverted her research specifically to the urban states of Uttar Pradesh, Rajasthan, Maharashtra, and Tamil Nadu. She concluded that families and people of the DHH community either late-deafened or born deaf were ashamed of deafness, and were continuously looking for ways to fix it, as if it was some kind of disease. Instead of making the person comfortable, and finding ways to help them adjust to society by accepting deafness to be unique, many families went to the extent of visiting several physicians to remove this "disease". They also experimented on the deaf with traditional and folk procedures, and obscure rituals, fasts, and vigils. It is important to keep in mind that only a tiny portion of the country was interviewed as most people were afraid and ashamed of getting interviewed because of the negative consequences (rejection, neglect, abuse by family and society).
Even today in 2023 the deaf community has cultural negligence. To describe further there are two community of deafness in India D and d what does this means?
D stands for the deaf who are profoundly or severely deaf and they are termed as culturally deaf. They accept themselves as deaf and are part of a deaf community. Sign language is their native language and they prefer to speak and use sign language. They are proud to proclaim themselves as deaf. Many of them have acquired a good knowledge of sign language and are comfortable with it and are in different professions. They are courageous and confident.
d the small d is also termed as medical or clinical deaf. These are those who became deaf after the actuation of the language or maybe sometimes due to accidents and other causes. They were hearing people but became deaf afterwards. They consider themselves part of the mainstream society i.e speaking community and they use a hearing aid and go for speech therapy for their mode of communication. Rather than using sign language, they prefer to use the hearing aid and search for medical treatment.
Mother does not want their children to speak, yes everybody does but when that kind of biological or natural error occurs we need to accept the fact. But sadly many do not accept the fact that their child is deaf and cannot communicate in spoken language. These had a negative effect on proper screening and counting as well as providing the required help and assistance to them. When on a survey of house to house when they do not openly say that they have a deaf person at their home it would it hard for the concerned authorities and department to reach for help them. And their community remain uneducated and deprived.

Deaf education 
The country of India places a large emphasis on education as it has grown to become a foundation of Indian society. Yet, there little to no reliable literature accessible on the education for DHH people (children specifically). The biggest problem that DHH children face is India has eighteen equally significant languages and there is not one significantly more dominant especially since the country is so diverse. For decades now, developmental education has been tormented by this issue of which language to teach. For instance if one is chosen over the other, how do you deal with the different dialects as they are extremely different from region to region? With hearing loss specifically, schools are limited for DHH children are limited to begin with and the only logical language to consider is English. The English language is emphasized much within the country as it is at least taught as the first or second languages within a large variety of schools. Now the major problem that arises from teaching ASL to the DHH community is that children would not be able to learn in their natural tongue. This would put families in an uncomfortable situation and chosen between branching out and imbibing a new cultural or preventing this cultural assimilation. Besides this dilemma there are numerous other problems that face teaching deaf education such as lack of funding, lack of experienced instructors, and lack of awareness and governmental support.

Employment 
A census conducted in 2011 revealed that out of 13.4 million individuals between the ages of 15-59 with a hearing disability in India 73.9% were marginal workers. This implies that only 26.1% of the active group were actually employed. It is extremely difficult for people of the DHH community to get an education as they are unable to obtain basic skills that the "normal" population would at a young age. Even with these intolerable statistics, there are not many organizations that are actively aiding the DHH community of India, besides the Mook Badhir Mandal (an organization that specifically targets job inequality within the nation).

Deaf organizations 

There are organizations such as the Deaf Enabled Foundation in India, Sai Swayam Society - Empowering the Deaf & Mute, and The National Association of the Deaf (India) that are advocating for the DHH community. The Deaf EnAbled Foundation of India focuses on gaining equal access for the deaf through "development, enhancement of quality of life, providing educational facilities, and social and cultural awareness." This organization has established a DEF skills center, academic academy and sign academy. Sai Swayam Society has been providing the DHH community with several resources such as skill training, remedial education, livelihood, and access to interpreters. Lastly, the NAD in India has a bit more access to funding and resources on a larger platform as they branch off from the government. With this governmental connection, they are able to and have been working with NGOs around the country to target deaf rights issues, hosted state level meetings to recruit members that have connections in unnoticed high deaf population areas of the nation, and organized three national consultations. Besides these three predominant organizations there are several other organizations within the nation that are actively taking steps to advocate for the DHH community.

References 

11. cultural negligence edited by Vishal Biswakarma: a student of AYJNIHS kolkata

See also
 Disability in India
 

Disability in India
India
Deaf culture in India